Terence William Brisley (born 4 July 1950) is an English former footballer who played as a midfielder in the Football League.

References

1950 births
Living people
English footballers
Footballers from Stepney
Association football midfielders
Charlton Athletic F.C. players
Leyton Orient F.C. players
Southend United F.C. players
Millwall F.C. players
Portsmouth F.C. players
Maidstone United F.C. (1897) players
Chelmsford City F.C. players
English Football League players